Lieutenant General Eric E. Fiel is a retired United States Air Force officer who served as commander of Air Force Special Operations Command from 2011 to 2014. The command is the Air Force component of United States Special Operations Command. AFSOC provides Air Force special operations forces for worldwide deployment and assignment to unified combatant commanders. The command has approximately 16,000 active-duty, Reserve, Air National Guard and civilian professionals.

Air Force career
Fiel entered the United States Air Force in 1981 as a graduate of Officer Training School. He has held a variety of assignments and has commanded at the squadron, group and wing levels. Additionally, he has held a variety of staff positions at major command, unified command, Air Staff and Secretary of the Air Force levels. Prior to his current assignment, he was the Vice Commander, Headquarters United States Special Operations Command, Pentagon, Washington, D.C.

Fiel has significant experience in combat and leadership positions in major joint contingency operations. He commanded a special operations squadron during Operation Deliberate Force in Bosnia and Operation Noble Anvil in Kosovo operations. From September 2001 to March 2003, he was forward-deployed as the Joint Special Operations Air Component commander in Operation Enduring Freedom. From May 2006 to April 2008, he was forward-deployed as a task force commander multiple times for operations Enduring Freedom and Operation Iraqi Freedom. On January 26, 2011, Fiel was nominated by the Pentagon to replace Donald Wurster as the commander of Air Force Special Operations Command.

AFSOC commander
On June 24, 2011, Fiel took over Air Force Special Operations Command from General Donald C. Wurster in a ceremony held at Hurlburt Field. “Lt. Gen. Wurster has been a brilliant and strong leader,” said Adm. Eric Olson, commander of the U.S. Special Operations Command. “He led by always putting people first in the air and on the ground. Today is more than a transfer of authority. We say goodbye to a great leader and friend. “Gen. Fiel will now bring his own vision,” Olson added. “There will be challenges, but I've seen him face challenges before and overcome many obstacles. In the transition from one commander to another, I know (AFSOC) will continue to excel.” Air Force Chief of Staff Gen. Norton Schwartz presided over the ceremony.

After Fiel assumed command he initiated a re-assessment of AFSOCs combat priorities. As a result, various changes were instituted, including a re-missioning of the MC-130W as the AC-130W gunship for increased capabilities in precision airstrike support, the 24th Special Operations Wing was stood up composed entirely of Special Tactics Squadrons as well as their training squadron. The Special Tactics Squadrons are made up of Special Tactics Officers, Combat Controllers, Combat Rescue Officers, Pararescuemen, Special Operations Weather Officers and Airmen, Air Liaison Officers, Tactical Air Control Party operators, and a number of combat support airmen which comprise 58 Air Force specialties.

Education
1980 Bachelor of Science degree in management, University at Buffalo, New York 
1984 Squadron Officer School, Maxwell AFB, Alabama 
1989 Master's degree in management, Troy State University
1992 Army Command and General Staff College, Fort Leavenworth, Kansas 
1992 Armed Forces Staff College, Norfolk, Virginia 
2001 Master's degree in strategic studies, Air War College, Maxwell AFB, Alabama 
2005 National Security Management Course, Syracuse University, New York
2008 Navy Senior Leader Business Course, Kenan-Flagler Business School, University of North Carolina at Chapel Hill

Assignments
 July 1981 – July 1982, student, undergraduate navigator training and electronic warfare officer training, 323rd Flying Training Wing, Mather AFB, California
 August 1982 – July 1984, MC-130E EWO instructor and executive officer, 8th Special Operations Squadron, Hurlburt Field, Florida 
 August 1984 – July 1985, standardization and evaluation EWO, 1st Special Operations Wing, Hurlburt Field, Florida
 August 1985 – August 1986, executive officer, 1st Special Operations Wing, Hurlburt Field, Florida 
 September 1986 – September 1987, Air Staff Training Program, Office of the Assistant Secretary of the Air Force for Acquisition, Washington, D.C. 
 September 1987 – September 1988, chief of MC-130E Standardization and Evaluation, Headquarters 23rd Air Force, Hurlburt Field, Florida 
 September 1988 – September 1989, chief of Electronic Combat Division, Headquarters 23rd Air Force, Hurlburt Field, Florida 
 September 1989 – February 1990, executive officer to the Vice Commander, 23rd Air Force, Hurlburt Field, Florida 
 February 1990 – May 1991, aide-de-camp to the commander of Air Force Special Operations Command, Hurlburt Field, Florida 
 June 1991 – June 1992, student, Army Command and General Staff College, Fort Leavenworth, Kansas 
 June 1992 – September 1992, student, Armed Forces Staff College, Norfolk, Virginia 
 September 1992 – April 1994, chief of North Asia Air Defense Division, Joint Intelligence Center Pacific, Pearl Harbor, Hawaii 
 April 1994 – August 1995, chief of Crisis Management Division, Joint Intelligence Center Pacific, Pearl Harbor, Hawaii 
 September 1995 – January 1997, director of operations, 18th Flight Test Squadron, Hurlburt Field, Florida 
 February 1997 – September 1999, assistant director of operations, director of operations and commander of 4th Special Operations Squadron, Hurlburt Field, Florida 
 September 1999 – July 2000, deputy commander of 16th Operations Group, Hurlburt Field, Florida
 August 2000 – June 2001, student, Air War College, Maxwell AFB, Alabama 
 July 2001 – April 2003, commander of Aviation Tactics Evaluation Group, Fort Bragg, North Carolina 
 April 2003 – May 2005, commander of 58th Special Operations Wing, Kirtland AFB, New Mexico 
 June 2005 – December 2005, director of operations, Air Force Special Operations Command, Hurlburt Field, Florida 
 December 2005 – April 2006, commander of Air Force Special Operations Forces, Hurlburt Field, Florida 
 April 2006 – April 2008, deputy commanding general of Joint Special Operations Command, Fort Bragg, North Carolina
 May 2008 – September 2009, director of Center for Force Structure, Requirements, Resources and Strategic Assessments, Headquarters U.S. Special Operations Command, MacDill AFB, Florida
 October 2009 – June 2010, chief of staff, Headquarters U.S. Special Operations Command, MacDill AFB, Florida
 June 2010 – June 2011, vice commander, Headquarters U.S. Special Operations Command, Washington, D.C.
 June 2011 – July 2014, commander of Air Force Special Operations Command, Hurlburt Field, Florida

Flight information
Rating: Master navigator 
Flight hours: More than 2,000 
Aircraft flown: T-43, T-37, MC-130E/H and AC-130A/H/U

Decorations and badges

Promotion dates
 Second Lieutenant July 15, 1981 
 First Lieutenant July 15, 1983 
 Captain July 15, 1985 
 Major October 1, 1991 
 Lieutenant Colonel December 1, 1996 
 Colonel March 1, 2001 
 Brigadier General Nov. 2, 2006
 Major General Dec. 3, 2009
 Lieutenant General June 11, 2010

References

Year of birth missing (living people)
Living people
United States Air Force generals
Recipients of the Legion of Merit
Recipients of the Air Medal
Recipients of the Defense Superior Service Medal